Bukali is a rural locality in the North Burnett Region, Queensland, Australia. In the  Bukali had a population of 63 people.

History 
The locality takes its name from the railway station name, assigned by the Queensland Railways Department on 15 September 1930. Bukali is  an Aboriginal word, meaning either cold or bad smell.

Bukali Provisional School opened in 1902. On 1 January 1909 it became Bukali State School. From 1912 it had a number of short openings and other temporary arrangements, before closing in 1916. In 1925 the school reopened as Monal Creek Provisional School, becoming Monal Creek State School in 1927. In June 1936 it was renamed Bukali State School. It closed permanently in 1963.

In the  Bukali had a population of 63 people.

References 

North Burnett Region
Localities in Queensland